Tool Academy is a competitive British reality television game show featuring twelve "unsuspecting bad boys" who have been sent to "relationship boot camp". It is presented by Rick Edwards and based on the U.S. version. Dr. Sandra Scott helps the contestants with their relationship problems and helps Edwards decide who is expelled.

Format
The twelve men, all of whom have been nominated by their respective girlfriends, fiancées or wives, initially think they are taking part in a competition for the title of "Britain's Ultimate Lad", "King of Men" or in the latest series "Man Games 2012". However, shortly after arriving they find out the truth: they are actually being entered into a "charm school" which focuses on teaching them how to behave as boyfriends. Each week, one contestant is eliminated and his girlfriend must choose whether or not to stay with him. The last contestant remaining will win a £25,000 prize and graduate Tool Academy.

Transmissions

External links
 
 

2010s British game shows
2011 British television series debuts
2012 British television series endings
E4 reality television shows
British dating and relationship reality television series
Television series by All3Media
English-language television shows